Birgitta Bremer (born 17 January 1950), Swedish botanist and academic, is professor at Stockholm University, and director of the Bergius Botanic Garden.

Career
Professor Bremer obtained her doctorate in botany in 1980 from Stockholm University, with the thesis "Taxonomy of mosses of the genus Schistidium".

In 1981 she was appointed docent at Stockholm University; 1983–1990 she was an instructor of systematics.

Between 1990 and 2000 she was systematic botany instructor; in 2000–2001 she served as dean of the department of systematics; 2000–2004 – professor of plant molecular systematics.

Since 2002 she has been director of the Bergius Fund and director of Botanical Garden. Since 2004 she has been a professor of systematics at Stockholm University.

Personal life
She is married to Kåre Bremer, and they have two children.

Achievements
On 11 February 2009 Professor Bremer, Professor Bergianus at the Bergius Foundation, The Royal Swedish Academy of Sciences, was elected a member of the Royal Swedish Academy of Sciences (Kungliga Vetenskapsakademien, KVA).

Bibliography

Articles

Books

 . 1980. Taxonomy of Schistidium (Grimmiaceae, Bryophyta). 8 pp. 
 . 2003. Introduction to phylogeny and systematics of flowering plants. Volume 33, Nº 2 de Acta Universitatis Upsaliensis: Symbolae botanicae Upsalienses. 7ª edición ilustrada de Uppsala Universitet, 102 pp. 
 . 1992. Phylogeny of the Rubiaceae (Chiococceae) based on Molecular and MOrphological data – Useful Approaches for Classification and Comparative Ecology. Volume 72 and 79 of Annals of the Missouri Botanical Garden. 767 pp.

References

External links 
 Eva Krutmeijer interview of Birgitta Bremer on the website of Linnaeus 300

1950 births
20th-century Swedish botanists
21st-century Swedish  botanists
21st-century Swedish women scientists
Swedish women botanists
Living people
Academic staff of Stockholm University
Members of the Royal Swedish Academy of Sciences
20th-century Swedish women scientists